Eolactoria sorbinii is an extinct prehistoric boxfish that lived during the Lutetian epoch of the middle Eocene, in Monte Bolca.  It had two pairs of long spines, one over each eye, and one pair beneath the anal and caudal fins, arranged very similarly to those possessed by the modern genus Lactoria (e.g., "cowfish"), but were, in comparison, much longer.  E. sorbinii had a fifth spine between the two eye-spines, arranged and looking very much like a nose.

The only known fossil specimen is about 5 cm (2 in) long.

See also

 Proaracana another boxfish that lived in Monte Bolca
 Oligolactoria a possible descendant from the Oligocene
 Prehistoric fish
 List of prehistoric bony fish

References

Eocene fish
Ostraciidae
Fossils of Italy
Fossil taxa described in 1975